Mount Burley is a peak,  high, located  southwest of Doris Bay, South Georgia. It was named by the UK Antarctic Place-Names Committee for Lieutenant Commander Malcolm K. Burley, Royal Navy, leader of the British Combined Services Expedition which surveyed this vicinity in 1964–65.

References

Mountains and hills of South Georgia